The 22nd Guldbagge Awards ceremony, presented by the Swedish Film Institute, honored the best Swedish films of 1986, and took place on 2 February 1987. The Sacrifice directed by Andrei Tarkovsky was presented with the award for Best Film.

Awards
 Best Film: The Sacrifice by Andrei Tarkovsky
 Best Director: Suzanne Osten for The Mozart Brothers
 Best Actor: Erland Josephson for Amorosa and The Sacrifice
 Best Actress: Stina Ekblad for Amorosa and The Serpent's Way
 Special Achievement: Jörgen Persson
 The Ingmar Bergman Award: Henry 'Nypan' Nyberg

References

External links
Official website
Guldbaggen on Facebook
Guldbaggen on Twitter
22nd Guldbagge Awards at Internet Movie Database

1987 in Sweden
1986 film awards
Guldbagge Awards ceremonies
1980s in Stockholm
February 1987 events in Europe